
Gmina Choroszcz is an urban-rural gmina (administrative district) in Białystok County, Podlaskie Voivodeship, in north-eastern Poland.

Villages
Apart from the town of Choroszcz, Gmina Choroszcz contains the villages and settlements of Babino, Barszczewo, Czaplino, Dzikie, Dzikie-Kolonia, Gajowniki, Gajowniki-Kolonia, Izbiszcze, Jeroniki, Klepacze, Kolonia Czaplino, Konowały, Kościuki, Krupniki, Kruszewo, Łyski, Mińce, Ogrodniki Barszczewskie, Oliszki, Pańki, Porosły, Porosły-Kolonia, Rogówek, Rogowo, Rogowo-Kolonia, Rogowo-Majątek, Ruszczany, Sienkiewicze, Sikorszczyzna, Śliwno, Turczyn, Zaczerlany, Zaczerlany-Kolonia, Złotoria, Złotoria-Kolonia, Złotoria-Podlesie, Żółtki and Żółtki-Kolonia.

Neighbouring gminas
Gmina Choroszcz is bordered by the city of Białystok and by the gminas of Dobrzyniewo Duże, Juchnowiec Kościelny, Kobylin-Borzymy, Łapy, Sokoły, Turośń Kościelna and Tykocin.

References
Polish official population figures 2006

Choroszcz
Białystok County